Neckarsulmer SU is the women's handball section of the sports club Neckarsulmer SU, from the town of Neckarsulm in Germany. They play their home matches in Ballei-Sporthalle, which have capacity for 1,200 spectators. They usually play in dark navy shirts and black shorts.

Kits

Arena 
Name: Ballei-Sporthalle
Location: Neckarsulm, Germany
Capacity: 1,200 spectators
Address: Felix-Wankel-Straße, 74172 Neckarsulm

Team

Current squad
Squad for the 2022-23 season.

Goalkeepers
 1  Valentyna Salamakha
 12  Sarah Wachter
 15  Anita Poláčková
Wingers 
RW
 5  Amber Verbraeken
 6  Tija Gomilar Zickero
LW
 17  Lin Johannsen 
Line player
 3  Sharon Nooitmeer
 23  Munia Smits

Back players 
LB
 2  Laila Ihlefeldt
 9  Olga Gorshenina
 11  Annefleur Bruggeman
 77  Carmen Moser
CB
 7  Fatos Kücükyildiz
 10  Daphne Gautschi
 21  Sophie Lütke
RB 
 4  Svenja Mann
 25  Nina Engel

Technical staff
Technical staff for the 2022-23 season.

  Head coach: Tanja Logwin
  Assistant coach: Mart Aalderink
  Goalkeeping coach: Oliver Rieth
  Athletic trainer: Marek Heichele
  Physiotherapist: Tina Rüger
  Physiotherapist: Julian Krämer
  Team doctor: Boris Brand
  Team doctor: Anne-Catherine Oppermann
  Team coach: Jutta Perger
  Team coach: Mike Vogelgesang

Notable players 

 Ann-Cathrin Giegerich
 Maike Daniels
 Nele Reimer
 Linda Mack
 Mia Møldrup
 Mette Gravholt
 Celia Schneider
 Seline Ineichen
 Emilia Galińska
 Birna Berg Haraldsdóttir
 Michelle Goos
 Valeria Gorelova
 Melanie Herrmann
 Mirjana Milenković
 Alena Vojtíšková
 Nives Ahlin

Notable former coaches 
 Emir Hadzimuhamedović
 Pascal Morgant
 Annamária Ilyés

Kit manufacturers

References

External links
 Official site

German handball clubs
Handball clubs established in 2009
Women's handball clubs
Women's handball in Germany
Neckarsulm
Sport in Baden-Württemberg